Raymond Bradwell Drake (24 October 1934 – 30 March 2013) was an English footballer who played in the Football League for Stockport County.

Career
Drake was born in Stockport and joined local side Stockport County in 1956. Drake made an instant impact for County scoring 19 goals in the first season as a professional. This prompted Bolton Wanderers to make a move for him as they saw him as a replacement for Nat Lofthouse but a move did not materialise. Drake then had a major fall out with the manager Willie Moir and he left and went on to play in non-league football.

He joined Altrincham F.C. in 1958, scoring once in 5 games. He later plated for Hyde United and Cheadle Town.

References
General
 . Retrieved 19 April 2013.
Specific

1934 births
2013 deaths
Footballers from Stockport
English footballers
Association football forwards
English Football League players
Stockport County F.C. players
Altrincham F.C. players
Hyde United F.C. players